Denisov was the name of noble family of Don Cossacks origin. Descendants of commander Denis Ilijn from stanitsa Piatiizbyanskaya that is now underwater of Tsimlyansk Reservoir. Count's of Russian Empire since 1799.

Notable members 

 Fedor Petrovich Denisov (1738–1803), General of Cavalry, was a first Earl of the Don Cossacks. 
 Andrian Karpovich Denisov (1763–1841), Lieutenant General in 1813, Ataman of Don Voisko in 1818.

External links
 Shumkov, A.A., Ryklis, I.G. List of noble families of the Don Cossacks in alphabetical order. VIRD Publ House, Sankt-Peterburg. 2000, 

Don Cossacks noble families
Russian noble families